Corporations such as CPC Corporation and Taiwan Financial Holdings Group are owned by the government of Taiwan (officially the Republic of China). Taiwan launched privatization programs in 1989.

List of government-owned corporations
CPC Corporation, Taiwan
Chunghwa Post
Export–Import Bank of the Republic of China
Kaohsiung Port Land Development Corporation (50% with Kaohsiung City Government)
Land Bank of Taiwan
National Chung-Shan Institute of Science and Technology
Taiwan Sugar Corporation
Taiwan Power Company
Taiwan Water Corporation
Taiwan Financial Holdings Group
Taiwan Tobacco and Liquor Corporation
Taiwan Railways Administration
Taiwan International Ports Corporation
Taiwan High Speed Rail Corporation
Taoyuan International Airport Corporation
Wang Film Productions (50% with Cartoon Network Studios/WarnerMedia)

See also 

 State-owned Enterprises Commission
 List of companies of Taiwan

References

 
Taiwan